W16CC-D, virtual and UHF digital channel 16, is a low-powered América TeVé-affiliated television station serving Miami, Florida, United States that is licensed to Westgate. The station is owned by HC2 Holdings.

History 
The station’s construction permit was issued on June 21, 1979, under the callsign of W67AP. It changed to W16CC on November 25, 2003, and then to the current W16CC-D on January 3, 2011.

Digital channels
The station's digital signal is multiplexed:

References

External links

Low-power television stations in the United States
Innovate Corp.
16CC-D
Television channels and stations established in 1983
1983 establishments in Florida